Ervin Mórich (27 May 1897 – 1982) was a Hungarian rower. He competed in the men's double sculls event at the 1924 Summer Olympics.

References

External links
 

1897 births
1982 deaths
Hungarian male rowers
Olympic rowers of Hungary
Rowers at the 1924 Summer Olympics
Rowers from Berlin